The Op. 56 mazurkas by Frédéric Chopin are a set of three mazurkas written for solo piano and presumably written in 1843–1844 and published in 1844.  A typical performance of all three mazurkas lasts around 12 minutes.

Structure 
The 3 pieces are as follows:

 Allegro non tanto (B major)
 Vivace (C major)
 Moderato (C minor)

Op. 56 No. 1 in B major is notable for its major-third-related 5-part rondo structure (B major-E major-B major-G major-B major).

References

External links 

Chopin Institute Page on the B major mazurka
Chopin Institute Page on the C major mazurka
Chopin Institute Page on the C minor mazurka

Mazurkas by Frédéric Chopin
1844 compositions
Music with dedications

Compositions in B major
Compositions in C major
Compositions in C minor